A revolutionary is a person who either participates in, or advocates a revolution. The term revolutionary can also be used as an adjective, to refer to something that has a major, sudden impact on society or on some aspect of human endeavor.

Definition

The term—both as a noun and adjective—is usually applied to the field of politics, but is also occasionally used in the context of science, invention or art. In politics, a revolutionary is someone who supports abrupt, rapid, and drastic change, usually replacing the status quo, while a reformist is someone who supports more gradual and incremental change, often working within the system. In that sense, revolutionaries may be considered radical, while reformists are moderate by comparison. Moments which seem revolutionary on the surface may end up reinforcing established institutions. Likewise, evidently small changes may lead to revolutionary consequences in the long term. Thus the clarity of the distinction between revolution and reform is more conceptual than empirical.

A conservative is someone who generally opposes such changes. A reactionary is someone who wants things to go back to the way they were before the change has happened (and when this return to the past would represent a major change in and of itself, reactionaries can simultaneously be revolutionaries). A revolution is also not the same as a coup d'etat: while a coup usually involves a small group of conspirators violently seizing control of government, a revolution implies mass participation and popular legitimacy. Again, the distinction is often clearer conceptually than empirically.

Revolution and ideology
According to sociologist James Chowning Davies, political revolutionaries may be classified in two ways:
According to the goals of the revolution they propose. Usually, these goals are part of a certain ideology. In theory, each ideology could generate its own brand of revolutionaries. In practice, most political revolutionaries have been anarchists, communists, socialists, Islamists, syndicalists, or nationalists.
According to the methods they propose to use. This divides revolutionaries in two broad groups: Those who advocate a violent revolution, and those who are pacifists.

Anarchism

The revolutionary anarchist Sergey Nechayev argued in Catechism of a Revolutionary: "The revolutionary is a doomed man. He has no private interests, no affairs, sentiments, ties, property nor even a name of his own. His entire being is devoured by one purpose, one thought, one passion - the revolution. Heart and soul, not merely by word but by deed, he has severed every link with the social order and with the entire civilized world; with the laws, good manners, conventions, and morality of that world. He is its merciless enemy and continues to inhabit it with only one purpose - to destroy it."Sergey Nechayev (1869). The Revolutionary Catechism .

Marxism–Leninism

According to Che Guevara, "the true revolutionary is guided by a great feeling of love. It is impossible to think of a true revolutionary lacking in this quality."
According to the Marxist Internet Archive, a revolutionary "amplif[ies] the differences and conflicts caused by technological advances in society. Revolutionaries provoke differences and violently ram together contradictions within a society, overthrowing the government through the rising to power of the class they represent. After destructing the old order, revolutionaries help build a new government that adheres to the emerging social relationships that have been made possible by the advanced productive forces."

See also

1911 Revolution
American Revolution
Armchair revolutionary
Conservative Revolution
Counter-revolutionary
Counterculture of the 1960s
Cuban Revolution
Cultural Revolution
February Revolution
French Revolution
German Revolution of 1918–1919
Iranian Revolution
Irish revolutionary period
Mexican Revolution
National syndicalism
October Revolution
Permanent revolution
Reformation
Revolutionary movement
Revolutionary movement for Indian independence
Revolutionary nationalism
Revolutionary socialism
Revolutionary song
Revolutionary terror
Revolutionary wave
Russian Revolution
Spanish Revolution of 1936
World revolution

References

External links
Castro: Revolutionary as Celebrity – slideshow by LIFE magazine